Frederick Charles Ellis (7 October 1900, – 1970) was an English footballer.

He was born in Sheppey, and played professionally for clubs including Watford and Gillingham, for whom he made over 100 Football League appearances. He subsequently played for Clapton Orient from where he moved on to Kent League club Ashford Town.

References

1900 births
1970 deaths
English footballers
Watford F.C. players
Gillingham F.C. players
Leyton Orient F.C. players
Ashford United F.C. players
People from the Isle of Sheppey
Association football midfielders
Kent Football League (1894–1959) players